This article covers the phonological system of New Zealand English. While New Zealanders speak differently depending on their level of cultivation (i.e. the closeness to Received Pronunciation), this article covers the accent as it is spoken by educated speakers, unless otherwise noted. The IPA transcription is one designed by  specifically to faithfully represent a New Zealand accent, which this article follows in most aspects (see table under ).

Vowels

Monophthongs 

The vowels of New Zealand English are similar to that of other non-rhotic dialects such as Australian English and RP, but with some distinctive variations, which are indicated by the transcriptions for New Zealand vowels in the tables below:

 chain shift
 
Recent acoustic studies featuring both Australian and New Zealand voices show the accents were more similar before World War II and the short front vowels have changed considerably since then as compared to Australian English. Before the shift, these vowels were pronounced close to the corresponding RP sounds. The stages of the shift are described below.
  was raised from near-open  to open-mid .
  was raised from mid  to close-mid .
This effectively removes the distinction between full and reduced vowels from the dialect as it makes  a stressable vowel.
 The now-close-mid   was further raised to near-close .
 Realisation of  varies between near-close front , near-close near-front , close-mid front , or close-mid near-front .
 The difference in frontness and closeness of the  vowel ( in New Zealand,  in Australia) has led to a long-running joke between Australians and New Zealanders whereby Australians accuse New Zealanders of saying "fush and chups" for fish and chips and in turn New Zealanders accuse Australians of saying "feesh and cheeps" in light of Australia's own  vowel shift.

 Before the velar nasal, the vowel is much more close and front than in other environments. Some speakers also use this variant before  and, less often, before other consonants.
This is less common and so it is not transcribed in this article.

The  vowel  may be realised with a slight on-glide when the word is stressed, with  becoming .
 The unstressed close front vowel in happy and video is tense and so it belongs to the  phoneme: , .

The  vowel  is very central, and may be realised with an on-glide, with  becoming .

 The  vowel  is not only higher and more front than the corresponding RP vowel , but it is also realised with rounded lips, unlike its RP counterpart. John Wells remarks that the surname Turner  as pronounced by a New Zealander may sound very similar to a German word Töne  (meaning 'tones'). Possible phonetic realizations include near-close front , near-close central , close-mid front , close-mid central , mid front  and open-mid front .
, 
The quality of those vowels is that of retracted cardinal : , open central , or somewhat higher .
– split
 New Zealand English has the – split: words like dance , chance , plant  and grant  are pronounced with an  sound, as in Southern England and South Australia. Can't is also pronounced  in New Zealand (like Australia but unlike the North American pronunciation  with the  vowel).

The  vowel may have an off-glide, typically word-finally, turning more  into .

The vowel may sometimes be unrounded.

Changes before 
These changes make words like too  sound different from tool  and leads to Ellen and Alan  both being pronounced .
Māori English
Māori English has a more fronted and lowered  vowel.
The  vowel is lowered compared to General New Zealand English.
The  vowel may be more fronted in Māori English.
The  vowel may be more rounded and more fronted.
Pasifika English

Diphthongs 

Phonetic quality
These are the usual NZE realizations. This means that the diphthong  can stand for either vowel, depending on the variety of NZE.
Elsewhere in the article, the offsets of the fronting diphthongs are written with  regardless of their precise height, following the way they are usually transcribed in English.
Unlike in Australian English, the open-mid back ending point  does not occur. This  realization is gaining ground among younger speakers of the General variety. According to one source,  is sometimes also used in General NZE, though more commonly with a somewhat more front onset: .
In the Cultivated variety, the onset is mid central and rounded, whereas the ending point is more back: .
 Sources do not agree on the exact phonetic realizations of certain NZE diphthongs:
 The starting point of  has been variously described as near-close central  and near-close near-back .

 The  diphthong  (as in "tour") is becoming rarer, and tends to be found only following . Most speakers use either  or  instead.
– merger
 The – merger (of the diphthongs  and ) is on the increase, especially since the beginning of the 21st century so that the phrase that's neither here nor there is pronounced  in General NZE, with here rhyming with there. In Cultivated NZE, the distinction is maintained: . Similarly, beer and bear as well as really and rarely are homophones: , . There is some debate as to the quality of the merged vowel, but the consensus appears to be that it is towards a close variant, . The proportion of teenagers showing the merger increased from 16% in 1983 to 80% in 1999. The merger is nearly complete, with most younger speakers being unable to tell the two diphthongs apart. As the merger is not yet fully complete, it is transcribed only in phonetic transcription, whereas in phonemic transcription the distinction is maintained: , etc.
Changes before 
 Before ,  becomes , making go  sound different to goal .

Transcriptions 
Sources differ in the way they transcribe New Zealand English. The differences are listed below. The traditional phonemic orthography for the Received Pronunciation as well as the reformed phonemic orthographies for Australian and General South African English have been added for the sake of comparison.

Consonants
New Zealand English consonants are consistent with those from those found in other varieties of English, such as Received Pronunciation.

Rhoticity
 New Zealand English is mostly non-rhotic (with linking and intrusive R), except for speakers with the so-called Southland burr, a semi-rhotic, Scottish-influenced dialect heard principally in Southland and parts of Otago. Older Southland speakers sound the  variably after vowels, but today younger speakers use  only with the  vowel and occasionally with the  vowel. Younger Southland speakers pronounce  in third term  but not in farm cart  (same as in General NZE).  Among r-less speakers, however, non-prevocalic  is sometimes pronounced in a few words, including Ireland , merely , err , and the name of the letter R . Some Māori speakers are semi-rhotic, although it is not clearly identified to any particular region or attributed to any defined language shift. The Māori language itself tends in most cases to use an r with an alveolar tap , like Scottish dialect.
Pronunciation of 
Even when not vocalised, it is darker in codas than in onsets, possibly with pharyngealisation. Vocalisation varies in different regions and between different socioeconomic groups; the younger, lower social class speakers vocalise  most of the time.
Pronunciation of 
All speakers are more likely to retain it in lexical words than in grammatical words, therefore even older speakers have a variable merger here.
Flapped 
 As with Australian English and American English the intervocalic  may be a flapped , so that the sentence "use a little bit of butter" may be pronounced . Evidence for this usage exists as far back as the early 19th century, such as Kerikeri being transliterated as "Kiddee Kiddee" by missionaries.
Glottal reinforcement
There is an increasing tendency for syllable-final  to be either reinforced or replaced with a glottal stop.
Pronunciation of 
Retraction of 
Fronting of 
A relatively recent phenomenon is  fronting, where interdental  are realised as labiodental . This feature was not present in New Zealand English until the end of the 20th century. A 2003 analysis found that word-final  sounds are fronted roughly half the time, with the word with being fronted more commonly than other words, and  sounds in other places are fronted around a quarter of the time.
Yod-dropping
The yod is sometimes also dropped in debut, hence .

Other features

 Some New Zealanders pronounce past participles such as grown , thrown  and mown  with two syllables, the latter containing a schwa  not found in other accents. By contrast, groan , throne  and moan  are all unaffected, meaning these word pairs can be distinguished by ear.
 The trans- prefix is usually pronounced ; this produces mixed pronunciation of the letter A in words like transplant . However,  is also heard, typically in older New Zealanders.
 The name of the letter H is almost always , as in North American, and is almost never aspirated.
 The name of the letter Z is usually the British, Canadian and Australian zed . Where Z is universally pronounced zee in places, names, terms, or titles, such as ZZ Top, LZ (landing zone), Jay Z (celebrity), or Z Nation (TV show) New Zealanders follow universal pronunciation.
 The word data is commonly pronounced , with  being the second most common, and  being very rare.

Pronunciation of Māori place names

The pronunciations of many Māori place names were anglicised for most of the nineteenth and twentieth centuries, but since the 1980s increased consciousness of the Māori language has led to a shift towards using a Māori pronunciation. The anglicisations have persisted most among residents of the towns in question, so it has become something of a shibboleth, with correct Māori pronunciation marking someone as non-local.

Some anglicised names are colloquially shortened, for example, Coke  for Kohukohu, the Rapa  for the Wairarapa, Kura  for Papakura, Papatoe  for Papatoetoe, Otahu  for Otahuhu, Paraparam  or Pram  for Paraparaumu, the Naki  for Taranaki, Cow-cop  for Kaukapakapa and Pie-cock  for Paekakariki.

There is some confusion between these shortenings, especially in the southern South Island, and the natural variations of the southern dialect of Māori. Not only does this dialect sometimes feature apocope, but consonants also vary slightly from standard Māori. To compound matters, names were often initially transcribed by Scottish settlers, rather than the predominantly English settlers of other parts of the country; as such further alterations are not uncommon. Thus, while Lake Wakatipu is sometimes referred to as Wakatip , Oamaru as Om-a-roo  and Waiwera South as Wy-vra , these differences may be as much caused by dialect differences – either in Māori or in the English used during transcription – as by the process of anglicisation. An extreme example is The Kilmog , the name of which is cognate with the standard Māori Kirimoko.

See also
 Australian English phonology
 South African English phonology
 Regional accents of English

References

Bibliography

Further reading

 
 
 
 

English phonology
New Zealand English